The surname Hedayat is used by different families of Middle East origins. In Iran when referring to that family name without further specification, it mostly refers to one prominent family originating from Mazanderan in Northern Iran. Notable people from this family include:

Abdollah Hedayat (1899-1968), Iranian army general
Ali Qoli Khan Mokhber od-Dowleh I (1830–1897), Minister of Education, Post and Telegraphs
Jafar Qoli Khan Nayyer-ol-Molk I (1831–1913), Minister of Education
Hassan Ali Khan Kamal-Hedayat, Nasr-ol Molk (1877–1957), Minister of Post and Telegraph
Mehdi Qoli Khan Hedayat, Mokhber-ol Saltaneh (1864–1955), Prime Minister of Iran
Mohammed Qoli Khan Hedayat, Mokhber-ol Molk (1865–1950), Minister of Finances
Morteza Gholi Khan Hedayat (1856–1911), President of the 1st Majles
Reza-Qoli Khan Hedayat (1800–1871), a Persian writer and poet
Reza Qoli Khan Hedayat, Nayer-ol Molk II (1872–1945), Minister of Education
Sadegh Hedayat (1903–1951), Iranian writer

Other people with the surname
Bahareh Hedayat (born 1981), Iranian student activist
Habibollah Hedayat (1917–2013), Iranian nutritionist
 Nelufar Hedayat (born 1988), Afghanistan-born journalist and presenter

See also
Hedayat Mosque, mosque in Tehran, Iran

References

Iranian families
Surnames of Iranian origin